The Stade Marcel Picot is a stadium located in Tomblaine, France, near the city of Nancy. Built in 1926, it is used by Ligue 2 football team Nancy.

The stadium was completely rebuilt and inaugurated in its new configuration in 2003. It is now able to hold 20,087 people.

Since summer 2010, Marcel-Picot is one of the very few French stadiums equipped with artificial turf.

Gallery

References

External links 
 Stade Marcel Picot - Stadium Guide

AS Nancy Lorraine
Marcel Picot
Sports venues in Meurthe-et-Moselle
Sports venues completed in 1926